Number, Please? is a 1920 American short comedy film directed by Hal Roach and Fred C. Newmeyer featuring Harold Lloyd.

Plot

While at an amusement park, trying vainly to forget the girl he has lost, a young man (Lloyd) sees the girl (Mildred Davis) with her new boyfriend (Roy Brooks). When her dog gets loose in the park, both suitors have to help her catch it. The girl's uncle, a balloonist, gives her a pass for two in his balloon, provided that her mother approves. She then offers to take along the first of her admirers who is able to get her mother's consent. The girl's new boyfriend races to her house to get the mother's permission, while the young man tries to telephone her. The young man faces crowded phone booths, gossiping operators, a crying baby and other obstacles in his effort to reach the mother first. Racing back to the girl, the two suitors bump into one another and a pickpocket who has just robbed the girl of her purse. The boy is mistaken for the pickpocket and must elude various policemen on his way back to meet the girl.

Cast
 Harold Lloyd as The Boy
 Mildred Davis as The Girl 
 Roy Brooks as The Rival
 Sammy Brooks as Little Man in Telephone Booth (uncredited)
 William Gillespie as Cop (uncredited)
 Wallace Howe as Man on Rollercoaster / Man at Phone Booth (uncredited)
 Mark Jones as Man on bench stealing purse (uncredited)
 Gaylord Lloyd as Man Managing Game Booth (uncredited)
 Ernie Morrison as Little Boy with Whisk Broom (uncredited)
 Hal Roach as Sailor (uncredited)
 Charles Stevenson as Cop / Man on Rollercoaster (uncredited)

See also
 Harold Lloyd filmography

External links

1920 films
1920 comedy films
1920 short films
Silent American comedy films
American silent short films
American black-and-white films
American comedy short films
Films directed by Fred C. Newmeyer
Films directed by Hal Roach
Films set in amusement parks
Films shot in Los Angeles
Films with screenplays by H. M. Walker
1920s American films